Carnahan may refer to:

People
the Carnahan family from Missouri, including
Mel Carnahan (1934–2000), American lawyer and politician
Herschel L. Carnahan (1879–1941), American politician
J. P. Carnahan (1832–1912), American mathematician and politician
James Carnahan (1775–1859), American clergyman and educator
Jennifer Carnahan (born 1976), American politician
Joe Carnahan (born 1969), American film director, screenwriter, and producer
Matthew Carnahan (born 1961), American producer, writer, and director
Matthew Michael Carnahan, American screenwriter
Norman F. Carnahan (born 1942), American chemical engineer
Robert H. Carnahan (died 1913), American military officer
Scott Carnahan (born 1953), American professional tennis player
Suzanne Carnahan, birth name of Susan Peters (1921–1952), American actress
Alex Carnahan (aka Lex), character from the TV series Containment
Evelyn Carnahan, character from The Mummy film series

Places
Carnahan Courthouse, Missouri
Carnahan High School of the Future, Missouri
Carnahan House, Louisiana
Carnahan House (Pine Bluff, Arkansas)
Carnahan Run, Pennsylvania